Kell on Earth is an American reality television series starring Kelly Cutrone, the founder of the public relations, branding and marketing firm People's Revolution.  The series premiered on February 1, 2010, on the Bravo cable network and cancelled after one season.

The first season averaged 574,000 viewers. The show did not return for a second season.

Synopsis
The series follows the life of Kelly Cutrone as she balances running her fashion PR company, People's Revolution, juggling Fashion Weeks in New York and London with being a single mother.

Additional cast
Robyn Berkley
Emily Bungert
Stefanie Skinner
Andrew Mukamal

Episodes

References

External links

2010 American television series debuts
2010 American television series endings
2010s American documentary television series
Bravo (American TV network) original programming
Fashion-themed reality television series
Television series by Magical Elves